Bay City Public Schools is a school district headquartered in Bay City, Michigan.

It serves sections of Bay, Midland, and Saginaw counties.

Schools
High schools:
 Bay City Central High School
 Bay City Western High School
 Bay City Eastern High School

Middle schools:
 Handy Middle School
 Western Middle School

Elementary schools:
 Auburn Elementary School
 Hampton Elementary School
 Kolb Elementary School
 MacGregor Elementary School
 Mackensen Elementary School
 McAlear-Sawden Elementary School
 Washington Elementary School

Former schools:
 Bay City Wenona School - Opened in 1962 and closed in 2006, remained unused as of 2015
 Thomas Jefferson School - Opened in 1959 and closed in 2006, used by Bay County Toys for Tots and Do-All Inc. as of 2015
 Riegel School - Opened in either 1970 or 1971 and closed in 2006, used by Bay City Public Schools as a storage facility as of 2015
 Trombley School - Opened in 1952, closed in 2002, remained unused as of 2015

References

External links
 Bay City Public Schools
School districts in Michigan
Bay City, Michigan
Education in Bay County, Michigan
Education in Midland County, Michigan
Education in Saginaw County, Michigan